The R. Gallagher Generating Station was a four-unit coal-burning power plant located along the Ohio River some two miles (3 km) downstream from New Albany, Indiana in southernmost Floyd County, Indiana. The total aggregate capacity (year-around) of the plant's four identical units was 560MW. Unit 2 began operating in 1958; unit 1 in 1959; unit 3 in 1960 and unit 4 in 1961. In early 2012, both Units 1 and 3 were retired.  Units 2 and 4 continued to operate because Duke Energy installed baghouses, greatly reducing the pollution and meeting the current standards set by the EPA. The plant's 2012 output was 280 megawatts (each unit is rated at 140 megawatts). The plant is connected to the grid by 138 and 230 kilovolt transmission lines.

Environmental impact

Sulphur dioxide emissions
As of 2006, R. Gallagher was the dirtiest major power station in the US in terms of sulphur dioxide gas emission rate: it discharged  of SO2 for each MWh of electric power produced that year (50,819 tons of SO2 per year in total).

Shutdown and Plant Closure
Duke Energy shutdown the plant on June 1, 2021, earlier than the previously scheduled retirement in 2022.  After shutdown Duke Energy will continue the process of closing coal ash basins on site, which could take several years. The Gallagher plant is expected to be dismantled at some point in the future.

See also

 List of power stations in Indiana
 Global warming

References

External links
Profile
View of the plant from the Ohio River

Energy infrastructure completed in 1958
Energy infrastructure completed in 1959
Energy infrastructure completed in 1960
Energy infrastructure completed in 1961
Buildings and structures in New Albany, Indiana
Coal-fired power stations in Indiana
Duke Energy